Digital terrestrial television in the Philippines are in development by the Philippine major broadcasting companies.

The Philippines uses the American NTSC standard for analog television since color television arrived in November 1966. The National Telecommunications Commission (NTC) announced in June 2010 that the Philippines would use the Japanese ISDB-T standard for digital terrestrial television (DTT) service, and issued a circular stating that the country's broadcasters must discontinue their analog services by the transition deadline of 11:59 p.m. (Philippine Standard Time, UTC+8) on December 31, 2015; but due to continuous delay of the release of the implementing rules and regulations for DTT broadcast, the target date was moved to 2023. The commission will be using the ultra-high frequency television channels from 14 to 51 (470-698 MHz) for the establishment of a DTT service and liberating channels 14 to 20 (470-512 MHz) which is being used for fixed and mobile services. However, before the announcement, several broadcasters performed trial broadcasts using the European DVB-T standard.

Preparation for the transition to DTT started with an issuance of Executive Order 546, series of 1979 and Republic Act 3846 or the Radio Control Law as amended by the local governing body for broadcast services, the NTC adopted the said order to promulgate rules and regulations in order to facilitate the entry of digital broadcast services in the Philippines and implement a specific standard for the delivery of DTT services. Subsequently organizing two technical working groups for the purpose of directing the governing body in the selection of appropriate DTT standard and upon the commendation of investors in the broadcast business, comprising the local broadcasters group, the Association of Broadcasters of the Philippines, and the NTC, issued Memorandum Circular June 2, 2010 on June 11, 2010, implementing the standard for digital terrestrial television.

Implementation

Since the early 2000s, studies have been carried out on the country's digital television transition. A "wait and see" plan is being trailed and examining progresses with no resolution to ensue with digital television services in the Philippines. The NTC chose to use the Japanese standard ISDB-T for digital television in the country in Memorandum Circular June 2, 2010, noting its capability to 3 levels of categorized modulation (audio, video and data services) to fixed, portable and handheld devices exclusive of the necessity for a supplementary communication facility.

In the draft version of the NTC's proposed regulations for DTV, broadcast companies who intend to provide digital terrestrial television service must have a congressional broadcast franchise before operating such services and have at least 15 television stations throughout the Philippines; have a minimum paid-up capital of ₱1 billion and accessible locally in 10 regions while broadcasting companies with less than the required television stations and availability locally, the minimum paid-up capital will be ₱1.2 billion, whereas new applicants with no present broadcast station, the paid-up capital will be ₱1.5 billion. For those broadcast companies who intend to deliver digital broadcast locally, must procure a congressional franchise and have at least ₱60 million per digital terrestrial television station. Concurring to the commission, the outline of digital technology in the broadcasting service would guarantee the effectiveness of the broadcast business and provide them the prospect to offer superior facilities to end-user. The draft outline as an enactment of the digital technology in the television broadcast is intended to provide greater number of channels, better screen resolution and stereo sounds through a conventional aerial antenna instead of a satellite or cable TV service.

Initially, the commission adopted the European standard DVB-T for digital broadcasting. The broadcast providers adopt either high-definition television format or its standard definition multiprogramming. The draft IRR also states that a duly broadcast provider with a congressional franchise will deliver analog television service and must carry its present analog television programs through its digital terrestrial television service. For digital broadcast provider aiming to offer pay-per-view or restricted access will be required to seek additional permission from the commission. Supplementary services may be permissible, subject to prevailing decrees, acts and laws. The draft rules equally specify the commission shall continue to process new applications for analog television stations up to December 31, 2008 but will no longer approve or authorized to broadcast beyond December 31, 2010 and all certified digital broadcast providers will relinquish their individual analog frequencies upon the termination of its analog television broadcast transmission by 11:59 p.m., December 31, 2015. However, since the last quarter of 2014, the digitization deadline has been postponed to 2019 and should be expected that all analog broadcasts will be shut off in 2023.

Deployment

Terrestrial

ABS-CBN: ABS-CBN Corporation intends to spend 1 billion pesos on its transition to digital broadcasting. ABS-CBN announced on April 4, 2011 that it was prepared to launch five free "premium" channels on a DTT platform as soon as the National Telecommunications Commission (NTC) finalize its regulations on digital television. ABS-CBN uses UHF channel 43 (647.143 MHz) for its ISDB-T test (also eventually move on UHF channel 14 (473.143 MHz) in order to be the first to scan) for its ISDB-T test, and previously used channel 51 (695.143 MHz) for test broadcasts using DVB-T. Their initial test was conducted in areas of Valenzuela, Bulacan, Rizal, Cavite and Laguna. In November 2010, ABS-CBN began rolling out its digital broadcast in 17 cities in Metropolitan Manila including selected areas in Bulacan and Pampanga. On February 11, 2015, ABS-CBN launched ABS-CBN TV Plus, a set-top box and digital TV service, making them the first TV network in the country to commercially launch DTT. It also operated exclusive DTT channels (channels that other topbox devices cannot receive) through an exclusive version of the Conditional Access System used by pay TV operators. However in 2020, the NTC, at the advice of its then-Solicitor General Jose Calida, issued a total of three cease-and-desist orders against ABS-CBN Corporation (including UHF Channel 43 and all digital channels of ABS-CBN TV Plus) to stop broadcasting due to an expired franchise that lapsed on 4 May 2020. The company was also planning to move its SFN frequency to UHF channel 14 in order to be the first service to scan on DTT receivers, but it never happened, and was eventually used instead by state-run People's Television Network, Inc.) On January 25, 2022, the National Telecommunications Commission awarded the frequencies that was used by ABS-CBN before it shutdown to Villar-owned Advanced Media Broadcasting System (AMBS) for channel 16, Aliw Broadcasting Corporation for channel 23 and Sonshine Media Network International for channel 43.
PTV: The state broadcaster People's Television Network, Inc. began DTT trials using ISDB-T in 2009 used channel 48 (677.143 MHz). In 2011, the Japanese government donated additional equipment to the network in order to improve its digital services. PTV 4 is also planning to operate an Emergency Warning Broadcast system (EWBS) using the digital platform. PTV later used channel 42 (641.143 MHz) frequency now moved to channel 14 (473.143 MHz).
TV5: TV5 Network, Inc. (formerly known as ABC Development Corporation/Associated Broadcasting Company) has been using ISDB-T for its DTT trials via a simulcast of flagship DWET-TV through DWDZ-TV. TV5 was broadcast on two DTT channels as part of their test broadcast: channel 42 (641.143 MHz) from Nation Broadcasting Corporation and channel 51 (695.143 MHz) from GV Broadcasting System. Currently, programs from TV5 (as well as its sister channels, One Sports and One PH) are primarily broadcast on SFN-based channel 18 (497.143 MHz), a frequency assigned by the NTC, while remaining in simulcast on the other two existing frequencies. On September 10, 2021, TV5 Network, Inc. launched the Sulit TV, a digital TV service.
GMA: GMA Network, Inc. applied for a digital television license from the NTC to install and maintain transmitting stations that will be attuned with and utilize to offer digital terrestrial television and digital mobile TV broadcast services, using UHF channel 27. Areas planned for a temporary digital broadcast covered the cities of Quezon City, Makati, Pasig, Tagaytay, and Angeles City in Pampanga; as well as areas like Ortigas, Cavite, and Calumpit in Bulacan. GMA was vocal about the NTC's choice of the country's DTV standard; on March 27, 2011, a GMA executive proposed the use of the updated European standard DVB-T2 as opposed to ISDB-T due to its better quality. However, the NTC did not change its decision to use ISDB-T, to which the company complied a few years after. Currently, GMA's domestic channels are broadcasting via DTT on UHF channel 15 (479.143 MHz). On June 26, 2020, GMA Network launched GMA Affordabox, a set-top box and digital TV service offering an encrypted recording feature only for the network's existing subchannels. The network started to broadcast on 16:9 ratio on February 27, 2023.
NET25 and INCTV: Two broadcast companies religiously-owned by the Iglesia Ni Cristo, Eagle Broadcasting Corporation and Christian Era Broadcasting Service International, launched the first digital television station in the country, DZCE-TV channel 49 (683.143 MHz), then under the GEMNET brand, in 2007. Initially broadcasting in DVB-T, it shifted to using ISDB-T in 2009. However, following the launch of INCTV, digital transmissions initially conducted during analog off-air periods from 12-4AM. By September 5, 2017, the network was given a "special authority" by the NTC to transfer its analog broadcasts on UHF channel 48 to allow channel 49 to conduct its full-time digital simulcast.
BEAM: Broadcast Enterprises and Affiliated Media, Inc., owned by a joint consortium led by Bethlehem Holdings, Inc., an investee of Globe Telecom Retirement Fund through its holding company HALO Holdings Inc. (which owns 39 percent of Altimax Broadcasting Company), applied for digital terrestrial broadcast but was still vocal to the DVB-T2 digital system. The station uses the frequency UHF Channel 31 (575.143 MHz).
SEC: Solar Entertainment Corporation is testing its DTT using ISDB-T on UHF Channel 21 (515.143 MHz) after Channel 22 (521.143 MHz) and UHF Channel 30 (569.143 MHz) but the second frequency eventually moves to UHF Channel 22 (521.143 MHz) replacing the main/first one possibly operated by subsidiary SBN. Solar also operates free-to-air and exclusive DTT channels. On the first quarter of 2018, Solar launched its own digital setup-box called Easy TV, until it ceased on September 30, 2019.
SMNI: Sonshine Media Network International is conducting a DTT testing using ISDB-T on UHF Channel 40 (629.143 MHz). The station uses the frequency UHF Channel 39 (623.143 MHz), UHF Channel 43 (647.143 MHz) and UHF Channel 44 (653.143 MHz).
Hope Channel Philippines and GNN: Gateway UHF Broadcasting and First United Broadcasting Corporation is conducting a DTT testing using ISDB-T on UHF Channel 46 (665.143 MHz).
CNN Philippines: On January 28, 2016, the state-sequestered Radio Philippines Network and Private company Nine Media Corporation is conducting a DTT testing using ISDB-T on UHF Channel 19 (503.143 MHz).
Light Network/ZOE TV: On March 1, 2017, ZOE Broadcasting Network made history on Philippine TV broadcasting as it switched to digital-only broadcasting, using DZOZ-TV Channel 33 (587.143 MHz). Light Network is the first TV network in the country to fully abandon its analog transmissions and shift to digital television, as network engineers stated that they have been prepared for years to make the switch happen. while the second frequency eventually using DZOE-DTV Channel 20 (509.143 MHz).
IBC: In October 2017, despite its impending privatization, the state-sequestered Intercontinental Broadcasting Corporation managed to conduct DTT testing using ISDB-T on UHF Channel 26 (545.143 MHz) then on March 18, 2022 moved to UHF Channel 17 (491.143 MHz) frequency and then the old one was temporarily back from March 21 but discontinued after March 31, 2022.
MBC/DZRH News Television: Manila Broadcasting Company, the largest radio network in the Philippines, has started conducting its DTT broadcast in Cebu City using UHF channel 43 (647.143 MHz).
UNTV: Progressive Broadcasting Corporation, owned and operated by Breakthrough and Milestones Productions International is currently testing its ISDB-T on UHF Channel 38 (617.143 MHz), and it can be viewed in Mega Manila, Bulacan, Pampanga, Tarlac, Cavite and other nearby provinces.
RJTV: On January 4, 2019, Rajah Broadcasting Network started its broadcasting on digital using UHF Channel 29 (563.143 MHz). RJTV is also the second TV network in the country to fully abandon its analog transmissions and shift to digital television.
Aliw Broadcasting/IZTV: On May 6, 2022, Aliw Broadcasting Corporation has started conducting a DTT testing using ISDB-T on UHF Channel 23 (527.143 MHz).
AMBS/All TV: On June 26, 2022, Advanced Media Broadcasting System has started conducting a DTT testing using ISDB-T on UHF Channel 16 (485.143 MHz).

Cable
Sky Cable: In October 2010, Sky Cable announced it would migrate at least 80% of its subscribers in Metro Manila to a digital cable platform with new Digiboxes by 2011. SkyCable allocated 20 percent of its Php 1 billion capital expenditure in order to fund the migration. SkyCable adopted the DVB-C standard for its digital cable system. The new platform also allowed SkyCable to additionally introduce high definition channels to its lineup.
Destiny Cable: In March 2009, Destiny Cable began to offer its own digital cable services, investing Php 500 to Php 700 million on headend and infrastructure updates and the distribution of digital set-top boxes for its subscribers.
Parasat Cable: Parasat Cable TV, the cable provider of Mindanao, introduced digital cable in July 2009. It has rolled out its services to Cagayan de Oro; municipalities of Opol and Tagoloan; in Malaybalay and San Carlos, Negros Occidental; Ginoog City; municipalities of Balingasag, Don Carlos and Valencia City, Bukidnon; and, the east and west sides of Misamis Oriental.

Satellite
Cignal: Cignal and its parent company MediaScape (which is owned by the PLDT) invested Php 1.5 billion in the implementation of its digital satellite TV services. Cignal uses the DVB-S2 standard for its digital satellite platform.
G Sat (Global Satellite): G Sat is a First United Broadcasting Corporation and Global Broadcasting Mutimedia Inc. company is one of the newest subscription-based Direct-To-Home satellite television service in the Philippines. Channel content in this DTH satellite TV service provider is received from program providers, compressed and broadcast via SES New Skies NSS 9 in DVB-S2 color format exclusively to its subscribers using the Integrated Receiver-Decoder.
SKY Direct: Sky Direct is a direct-broadcast satellite (DBS) service provider in the Philippines. It is owned and operated by Sky Cable Corporation, a subsidiary of ABS-CBN Corporation. On December 23, 2015, Sky was granted a provisional authority by the NTC to operate and maintain a DBS service in the country for a period of 18 months and plans to spend at least Php 252 million for its initial roll-out. It is being carried by SES NSS-11 satellite using DVB-S2 digital television broadcast standard in the Ku band and Verimatrix encryption system to protect its content from signal piracy. On June 30, 2020, the NTC and Solicitor General Jose Calida issued an alias cease-and-desist order (ACDO) against SKY Direct to stop its operations due to the expired franchise of ABS-CBN.

Mobile
Certain mobile phones and tablets carry the ability to receive digital TV signals. The following brands are:
Starmobile
Cherry Mobile
MyPhone
Alcatel
Samsung
O-Plus
SKK Mobile

Dongle
ABS-CBN TV Plus Go
GMA Now

Internet
With the advent of digital streaming systems at the start of mid-2010s, there are active video streaming services available in the Philippines namely:

 Netflix
 Amazon Prime Video
 Cignal Play
 Hayu
 Disney+
 HBO Go
 iflix
 iQIYI
 iWantTFC
 Pop TV
 TAP Go
 Tubi
 Jungo+
 Viu
 WeTV
 Google Play Movies
Rakuten Viki
 SonyLIV
 DisneyLife (defunct)
 HOOQ (defunct)
 FOX+ (defunct)

Developments
July 2007. Television firms who plan to broadcast digital terrestrial television services to television and other communication devices cannot implement such as the commission is revising its guidelines on digital television programming. However, the commission allows broadcast firms to test its system while waiting for the implementing rules and regulations (IRR). The development comes in light with telecom company, Smart Communications Inc. through its MediaQuest Holdings, Inc. for its myTV service. The commission reiterates in the absence of IRR, the telecom company cannot charge the service being offered to its subscribers.
June 2009. In formulating the transition from analog television broadcast to digital terrestrial television (DTT) transmission in the Philippines and to guide the commission in outlining the planned implementing rules and regulations for the enactment of DTT service, ultra-high frequency television channels 14 to 51 (470-698 MHz) will be assigned to the DTT Broadcast Service and deliberating further channels 14 to 20 (470-512 MHz) which is being used by Fixed and Mobile Service. On June 24, 2009, the local unit of the commission, the Frequency Management Division is assigned to formulate a frequency allocation plan for the effective transmission of appropriate users of channels 14 to 20.
February 2010. The Philippines is anticipated to deferment its planned analog television signal automatic switch-off in 2015 due to technicalities in implementing an official digital terrestrial television platform. While other members of Association of Southeast Asian Nations cooperatively accepted the digital video broadcasting-terrestrial or the DVB-T as its favored standard, the Philippines have not adopted any platform.
December 2010. The governments of Japan and the Philippines reached a collaboration decision in adopting a memorandum of cooperation resulting in the commission’s earlier pronouncement to use the Japanese’s Integrated Services Digital Broadcast-Terrestrial platform for digital terrestrial television broadcast standard for the Philippines. According to the Commission on Information and Communications Technology, the Japanese government is keen on guiding Filipino counterpart to the technology. The Philippine government also requested its counterpart to shoulder the cost of set-top boxes and also deliberating in rescheduling the compulsory switchover from analog transmission to digital broadcast from an earlier target.
February 2011. The NTC plans to implement the digital terrestrial television service in select key cities in the Philippines in 2012. The governing body desires the transition be implemented gradually. The technical working group has yet not classified where the transition will take place. Key cities in the Philippines are being considered but in the absence of an implementing rules and regulations, the digital terrestrial television service may not be fully consummate to the viewing public. While the transition will be made progressively, broadcasting networks can still convey analog television service although DTT is being rationalized in other areas. Meanwhile, the commission set an 85 percent compliance rate before it consider terminating all analog signals for broadcast transmission.
March 2011. The NTC asked to reevaluate the platform to be used for the Philippines digital television broadcast. The regulator is studying the possible implementation of a newer platform, the European second-generation Digital Video Broadcasting-Terrestrial (DVB-T2) substituting the Japanese Integrated Services Digital Broadcast-Terrestrial (ISDB-T) standard that the commission adopted earlier and was the basis of creating implementing rules and regulations for digital broadcast. Experts announced the DVB-T2 is superior to its Japanese counterpart. Broadcasting firms, GMA Network, Inc. conveyed their support to reevaluate its earlier decision to adopt ISDB-T platform. The Commission adopted the ISDB-T primarily owing in terms of affordability.
April 2011. One of Philippines broadcasting firms, ABS-CBN Corporation, criticized the NTC for conveying varied indications on the Philippines official stand on digital television standard. The firm panned the commission on its incompetence in supporting its initial pronouncement to implement Japanese digital television standard, the Integrated Services Digital Broadcast-Terrestrial (ISDB-T). In 2010, the commission officially led the digital television period in the Philippines and releases a memorandum circular agreeing to the use of ISDB-T as the standard digital platform. But in recent developments, the commission is considering the European digital television platform, the European Digital Video Broadcast-Terrestrial (DVB-T). According to the commission, the European platform is superior to its Japanese counterpart.
May 2011. Television companies in the Philippines have supported the local governing body to reevaluate the digital television standard to be used, and the attempt to reconsider the advancement of the Japanese technology (ISDB-T) over the newer version of the European digital television platform. Broadcasting companies initiated to delay the switchover provided the technology will be used is far more advanced than the initial digital standard adopted on June 11, 2010. TV5 agreed to do comparative tests with the European and Japanese standard. The commission is simultaneously drafting the implementing rules and regulations for digital terrestrial television broadcast under the Japanese platform and reviewing the DVB-T2 European standard.
August 2011. The NTC finalized its evaluation on the chosen standard for the digital terrestrial television (DTT) broadcast service in the Philippines. The commission adopted the Japan’s Integrated Services Digital Broadcasting-Television (ISDB-T) standards over its European counterpart, the Digital Video Broadcasting-Television (DVB-T2).
October 2013. The NTC reconfirmed the recommendation to adopt the Japanese Digital Television standard as the country's national TV standard after a public hearing.
December 17, 2014. NTC released the draft implementing rules and regulations for the Philippines' transition to digital television.
March 2016. The NTC holds public consultations regarding the migration plan to digital television. It envisions the Philippines to go "fully migrated to digital TV" in three to five years (2019-2021).
February 2017. The Department of Information and Communications Technology (DICT) officially start the switch-over from Analog to Digital. DICT also moves the schedule for total shut-off of analog TV services to the year 2023.
February 2018. NTC released the implementing rules and regulations on the re-allocation of the UHF Channels 14-20 (470–512 Megahertz (MHz) band) for digital terrestrial television broadcasting (DTTB) service. All operating and duly authorized Mega Manila VHF (very high frequency) television networks are entitled to a channel assignment from Channels 14 to 20.

See also 
 Digital television transition
 Television in the Philippines
 List of digital television stations in the Philippines

References 

 
Philippines
Science and technology in the Philippines